Dennis Fowlkes was a professional American football player who played linebacker for the Minnesota Vikings and Miami Dolphins.

References

1961 births
Players of American football from Columbus, Ohio
American football linebackers
Minnesota Vikings players
Miami Dolphins players
West Virginia Mountaineers football players
Living people
National Football League replacement players